Jozef Mrena is a Slovak professional ice hockey player who played with HC Slovan Bratislava in the Slovak Extraliga.

References

1980 births
Living people
HC Slovan Bratislava players
HK 36 Skalica players
HK 95 Panthers Považská Bystrica players
HK Dukla Trenčín players
HK Trnava players
Prince George Cougars players
ŠHK 37 Piešťany players
Slovak ice hockey centres
Slovak expatriate ice hockey players in Canada